Jelle Ribbens (born 17 March 1992) is a Belgian male volleyball player. He is part of the Belgium men's national volleyball team. On club level he played for Maxéville Nancy during 2014-2015. He plays for Nice Volley-Ball.

References

External links
Profile at FIVB.org

1992 births
Living people
Belgian men's volleyball players
People from Brasschaat
Belgian expatriates in France
Expatriate volleyball players in France
Sportspeople from Antwerp Province